The 1994 PSA Men's Ballantines World Open Squash Championship is the men's edition of the 1994 World Open, which serves as the individual world championship for squash players. The event took place in Barcelona in Spain from 9 September to 14 September 1994. Jansher Khan won his sixth World Open title, defeating Peter Marshall in the final.

Seeds

Draw and results

See also
PSA World Open
1994 Women's World Open Squash Championship

References

External links
World Squash History

World Squash Championships
M
International sports competitions hosted by Spain
1990s in Barcelona
Squash tournaments in Spain
Sports competitions in Barcelona
1994 in Spanish sport
September 1994 sports events in Europe
1994 in Catalan sport